Kilcoole railway station is a railway station in Kilcoole, County Wicklow, Ireland. The station serves the village of the same name and the nearby village of Newtownmountkennedy.

Facilities and services 

The station has one through platform and is unmanned, has no ticket machine or toilet and is not wheelchair accessible.

The station is one of the least served on the whole Irish Rail network, with only a handful of trains per day. These include, on weekdays, three trains per day to Dublin Connolly (with one continuing to Dundalk) two to Rosslare Europort, and one train to Wexford. On Saturdays there are four trains to Connolly, (with one continuing to Dundalk) and three to Rosslare Europort. On Sundays and bank holidays there are three trains in each direction.

History
The station was opened on 30 October 1855 by the Dublin, Wicklow and Wexford Railway as Kilcool. The station was closed in 1964 due to a lack of resources or use. It reopened on 2 November 1980, renamed Kilcoole.

Location
The station is located on Kilcoole Beach, right beside the coastline. Kilcoole village is 1.6 km from the station, while Newtownmountkennedy is 6 km from the station.

Road transport
There is no public road transport to or from the station. The nearest bus stop is at Beechdale, located 900m from the station which is served by Dublin Bus routes 84/84a (Newcastle to Blackrock, via Bray Station) and 84X (Newcastle to Dublin, via UCD).

There is a free car-park, located to the west of the station's platform.

Gallery

See also 
 List of railway stations in Ireland

References

External links

Irish Rail Kilcoole Station Website

Iarnród Éireann stations in County Wicklow
Railway stations in County Wicklow
Railway stations opened in 1855
Railway stations closed in 1964
Railway stations opened in 1980
1855 establishments in Ireland
Railway stations in the Republic of Ireland opened in the 19th century